The 2016–17 Belgian First Amateur Division is the inaugural season of the newly created division at the third-tier football league in Belgium, as it was established in 2016. The fixtures were announced on 23 June 2016.

Participating teams

For the inaugural season the following teams will participate:
 The bottom eight teams from the 2015–16 Belgian Second Division: Dessel Sport, Seraing United, Virton, ASV Geel, Deinze, Patro Eisden Maasmechelen, Heist and Coxyde
 WS Brussels who were refused a Belgian professional football license and were therefore relegated to the Belgian First Amateur Division in spite of becoming champions in the 2015–16 Belgian Second Division. As a result, Roeselare avoided relegation and remained in the Belgian Second Division.
 The top two teams in both group A and group B of the 2015–16 Belgian Third Division that had applied and obtained a Belgian remunerated football license: Hamme, Oudenaarde, Beerschot Wilrijk and Oosterzonen Oosterwijk
 The three Promotion play-offs winners: Sprimont-Comblain, FCV Dender EH and Hasselt.

Regular season

League table

Results

Promotion play-offs
The teams finishing in the top four positions entered the promotion play-offs. The points obtained during the regular season were halved (and rounded up) before the start of the playoff. As Beerschot-Wilrijk were the only team which requested and obtained a licence, they were already certain of promotion even before the start of the playoffs.

Number of teams by provinces

References

Belgian National Division 1
Bel
3